In Austria, violating public decency is display of an act that is considered a violation of the generally recognized principles of decency to be observed in public.

Background

A key condition is that the criminal behavior occurs in public (i.e. in a group of people in a public setting). This means that beyond the circle of those involved, other people have the opportunity to perceive the behavior. Examples of decency violations include: For example, urinating in public, chanting the slogan "A.C.A.B." or flashing the finger. Prosecutions of decency are primarily carried out or initiated by the federal police.

In both Vienna and Graz young men belched or farted loudly in the presence of police officers and were fined €70 and €50 respectively.

References

Law of Austria